Monica Niculescu and Klára Koukalová were the defending champions, but Koukalová chose not to participate.
Niculescu partnered Vitalia Diatchenko, but lost in the final to Kiki Bertens and Johanna Larsson, 5–7, 3–6.

Seeds

Draw

References
 Draw

Hobart International
2015 Hobart International